The Compton Brothers was a duo consisting of brothers Bill and Harry Compton. The group won a talent contest in 1965 sponsored by Columbia Records. Between 1966 and 1975, they recorded for Dot Records, charting in the top 20 of the Hot Country Songs charts with covers of Jumpin' Gene Simmons' "Haunted House" and The Coasters' "Charlie Brown". The band released three albums for Dot.

Discography

Albums

Singles

References

American country music groups
Country music duos
Dot Records artists
Musical groups from St. Louis
Sibling musical duos
Musical groups established in 1966